Cecilia is a census-designated place (CDP) and unincorporated community in Hardin County, Kentucky, United States. As of the 2010 census it had a population of 572.

The town was formerly called "Cecilian Junction" because of its location at the junction of the Illinois Central Railroad's Louisville-Paducah main line and its branch to Hodgenville. (The line now belongs to the Paducah and Louisville Railway, and the branch is now truncated to Elizabethtown.) The community is part of the Elizabethtown–Fort Knox Metropolitan Statistical Area, and a significant part of the area served by the Cecilia post office is now within the Elizabethtown city limits.

Kentucky Route 86 runs through the town, ending just south of the town at an intersection with U.S. Route 62.

Demographics

Notable person
Cecilia is the home of Ron Lewis, who represented Kentucky's 2nd congressional district in the United States Congress between 1994 and 2009.

References

Census-designated places in Hardin County, Kentucky
Unincorporated communities in Kentucky
Elizabethtown metropolitan area
Census-designated places in Kentucky